Lobsters is a British documentary film made in 1935 and released in 1936 about lobster fishermen in the port of Littlehampton in Sussex, England and is one of the first aquatic films ever made.  Hungarian-born László Moholy-Nagy spent several weeks getting to know the fishermen and their families, which had a long history of fishing for lobsters.  Moholy Nagy also got to know the local community and listened to their dialect.

References

External links
 Lobsters film on BFI website
 

British documentary films
Documentary films about England
Films set in Sussex
1936 documentary films
1936 films
British black-and-white films
Lobster fishing
Documentary films about fishing
1930s English-language films
1930s British films